Giovanni Andrea Monreale (1653–1726) was a Roman Catholic prelate who served as Archbishop of Reggio Calabria (1696–1726) and Archbishop of Lanciano (1695–1696).

Biography
Giovanni Andrea Monreale was born on 7 Oct 1653	in Brindisi, Italy. he was ordained a deacon on 8 Apr 1685, and a priest on 15 Apr 1685.

On 4 Jul 1695, he was appointed Archbishop of Lanciano by Pope Innocent XII. On 10 Jul 1695, he was consecrated bishop by Pier Matteo Petrucci, Cardinal-Priest of San Marcello al Corso, with Francesco Gori, Bishop of Catanzaro, and Domenico Diez de Aux, Bishop of Gerace, serving as co-consecrators. 

On 21 May 1696, Pope Innocent XII appointed him Archbishop of Reggio Calabria. He served as Archbishop of Reggio Calabria until his death in July 1726.

Episcopal succession

References

External links and additional sources
 (for Chronology of Bishops)  
 (for Chronology of Bishops)  
 (for Chronology of Bishops) 
 (for Chronology of Bishops) 

17th-century Italian Roman Catholic archbishops
18th-century Italian Roman Catholic archbishops
Bishops appointed by Pope Innocent XII
1653 births
1726 deaths